The 68th Bodil Awards were held on 28 February 2015 in the Bremen Theater in Copenhagen, Denmark, honouring the best national and foreign films of 2014.

On 4 February 2015 it was announced that Danish American actor Viggo Mortensen would receive the 2015 Bodil Honorary Award.

Silent Heart directed by Bille August became the big winner at the Awards: It won the Best Danish Film Award, Augusts's third, and 27 years since he won his second Bodil for Pelle the Conqueror in 1988. 29-year-old Danica Curcic won her first Bodil Award for Best Actress in a Leading Role as little sister Sanne in the film, while Pilou Asbæk took home his second Bodil statuette for Best Actor in a Supporting Role as Sanne's hash fuming boyfriend. Danish Film Critics Association in collaboration with the Danish Writers Guild had instituted a new award for Best Screenplay, which went to  also for Silent Heart.

Winners and nominees 
Winners in bold

Best Danish Film 
 Silent Heart
 All Inclusive
 Speed Walking
 The Sunfish
 When Animals Dream

Best Actor in a Leading Role 
  – The Sunfish
  – Speed Walking
  - 
 Mikael Persbrandt – Someone You Love

Best Actress in a Leading Role 
 Danica Curcic – Silent Heart
 Bodil Jørgensen – All Inclusive
 Ghita Nørby – Silent Heart
 Paprika Steen – Silent Heart
 Sonia Suhl – When Animals Dream

Best Actor in a Supporting Role 
 Pilou Asbæk – Silent Heart
 Anders W. Berthelsen – Speed Walking
 David Dencik – Speed Walking
 Lars Mikkelsen – When Animals Dream
 Ali Sivandi – Flow

Best Actress in a Supporting Role 
  – The Sunfish
 Sarah-Sofie Boussnina – The Absent One
 Danica Curcic – The Absent One
 Sidse Babett Knudsen – Speed Walking
 Birgitte Hjort Sørensen – Someone You Love

Best American Film 
 Boyhood
 Her
 Inside Llewyn Davis
 Dallas Buyers Club
 Nebraska

Best Non-American Film 
 Force Majeure
 Winter Sleep
 Ida
 Two Days, One Night
 The Past

Best Documentary 
 The Look of Silence

Recipients

Cinematographer 
 Niels Thastum for When Animals Dream

Henning Bahs Award 
 Rie Lykke for Speed Walking

Best Screenplay 
  for Silent Heart

Special Award 
 , film editor, for editing Nymphomaniac and Nymphomaniac Director's Cut

Honorary Award 
 Viggo Mortensen

See also 

 2015 Robert Awards

References

External links 
  

2014 film awards
Bodil Awards ceremonies
2015 in Copenhagen
February 2015 events in Europe